Hot tub folliculitis (pseudomonal folliculitis) is a common type of folliculitis, a condition which causes inflammation of hair follicles.

This condition is caused by an infection of hair follicles by a non-pathogenic strain of the bacterium Pseudomonas aeruginosa. The bacterium is commonly found in hot tubs, water slides, and rarely in swimming pools. Hot tub folliculitis appears on the skin in the form of a rash, roughly resembling chicken pox and then develops further to appear as a pimple. Children are the most likely to develop hot tub rash. Hot tub folliculitis can be extremely painful and/or itchy, and when left alone without scratching will go away much more quickly.

In most cases, the rashes will usually resolve after about 7 to 10 days, only leaving a hyperpigmented lesion that goes away after a few months. Antibiotics may be prescribed in some cases. If the rash continues to appear longer than the 7- to 10-day time period, a physician should be consulted.

See also 
 Skin lesion

References 

Bacterium-related cutaneous conditions